This is a list of notable people who were born or have lived in Irkutsk, Russia.

Born in Irkutsk

18th century

1701–1800 
 Nikolai Polevoy (1796–1846), Russian editor, writer, translator and historian

19th century

1801–1850 
 Ksenofont Polevoy (1801–1867), Russian writer, literary critic, journalist, publisher and translator
 Vladimir Kornilov (1806–1854), Russian naval officer who took part in the Crimean War
 Mikhail Peskov (1834–1864), Russian history and genre painter and lithographer
 Pyotr Gorlov (1839–1915), Russian geologist and engineer
 Alexei Pavlovich Fedchenko (1844–1873), Russian naturalist and explorer
 Alexander Sibiryakov (1849–1933), Russian gold mine and factories owner and explorer of Siberia

1851–1900 
 Nikolay Vtorov (1866–1918), Russian industrialist
 Yakov Gakkel (1874–1945), Russian scientist and engineer
 Konkordiya Samoilova (1876–1921), Russian bolshevik
 Nikolai Luzin (1883–1950), Russian mathematician
 Jacques Gershkovitch (1884–1953), Russian conductor and musician
 Mark Azadovsky (1888–1954), Russian scholar of folk-tales and Russian literature
 Alexander I. Pogrebetsky (1891–1952), Russian economist, financier and businessman
 Valéry Inkijinoff (1895–1973), French actor of Russian-Buryat origin
 Sergej Golovčenko (1898–1937), Croatian-Russian caricaturist, comic book author and writer
 Maria Klenova (1898–1976), Russian and Soviet marine geologist
 Nikolay Okhlopkov (1900–1967), Soviet actor and theatre director
 Alexander Shemansky (1900–1976), Russian opera singer (tenor)

20th century

1901–1910 
 Mikhail Romm (1901–1971), Soviet film director
 Nikolay Kamov (1902–1973), leading constructor of the Soviet-Russian Kamov helicopter design bureau
 Natalya Sats (1903–1993), Russian stage director
 Pavel Nilin (1908–1981), Soviet writer, journalist and playwright
 Mikhail Mil (1909–1970), Soviet aerospace engineer

1911–1920 
 Andrei Katkov (1916–1995), Russian Catholic bishop
 Vecheslav Zagonek (1919–1994), Soviet-Russian painter
 Ivan Petrov (1920–2003), Russian bass opera singer

1921–1930 
 Lyubow Usava (born 1921), Russian-born Belarusian architect
 Janina Niedźwiecka (1922–2004), Polish film editor
 Pyotr Nikolayev (born 1924), Soviet sports shooter
 Valentin Berlinsky (1925–2008), Russian cellist
 Nikolay Krasilnikov (born 1927), Russian scientist and educator in the fields of image transmission, image compression and human visual system
 Rodislav Chizhikov (1929–2010), Russian cyclist
 Konstantin Vyrupayev (1930–2012), Soviet wrestler and Olympic Champion

1931–1940 
 Tamara Novikova (born 1932), Soviet female cyclist
 Anatoliy Samotsvetov (born 1932), Soviet athlete who competed mainly in the hammer throw
 Anatoly Novoseltsev (1933–1995), Russian orientalist
 Boris Volynov (born 1934), Soviet cosmonaut
 Leonid Borodin (1938–2011), Russian novelist and journalist

1941–1950 
 Valerii Postoyanov (1941–2018), Soviet sports shooter
 Vyacheslav Trubnikov (born 1944), Russian journalist, political scientist and diplomat

1951–1960 
 Olga Buyanova (born 1954), Honored Master of Sports coach in Rhythmic gymnastics of the USSR and Russia
 Andrei Mironov (1954–2014), Russian human rights activist, reporter, fixer, interpreter
 Vasiliy Kulik (1956–1989), Soviet serial killer
 Andrei Semyonov (born 1957), Russian football player
 Sergey Solodovnikov (born 1958), Belarusian professional football coach and Soviet player
 Robertas Dargis (born 1960), President of Lithuanian Confederation of Industrialists
 Aleksandr Krupskiy (born 1960), Russian pole vaulter
 Oleksandr Shlapak (born 1960), Ukrainian politician, bureaucrat, and former Minister of Finance of Ukraine
 Konstantin Volkov (born 1960), Soviet pole vaulter

1961–1970 
 Galina Belyayeva (born 1961), Soviet and Russian film and theatre actress
 Dmitry V. Bisikalo (born 1961), Russian astrophysicist
 Alexander Shulgin (born 1964), Russian author and composer
 Sergei Khodakov (born 1966), Russian paralympic athlete competing mainly in category F12 throwing events
 Denis Petushinskiy (born 1967), retired pole vaulter who represented New Zealand after switching from Russia in 1998
 Anatoli Ivanishin (born 1969), Russian cosmonaut
 Dmitri Kondratyev (born 1969), Russian cosmonaut

1971–1980 
 Oleg Lidrik (born 1971), Russian professional football official and a former player
 Oxana Kostina (1972–1993), Soviet individual rhythmic gymnast
 Aleksandr Averbukh (born 1974), Israeli Olympic athlete who competed in the pole vault
 Ivan Vyrypaev (born 1974), Russian playwright, screenwriter, film director, actor and art director
 Alexander Bocharov (born 1975), Russian professional road bicycle racer
 Felix Korobov (born 1975), Russian conductor and cellist
 Denis Matsuev (born 1975), Russian classical pianist
 Konstantin Genich (born 1978), Russian professional football player
 Andrey Mishin (born 1979), Russian boxer
 Maria Bruntseva (born 1980), Russian volleyball player
 Rezo Dzhikiya (born 1980), Russian footballer

1981–1990 
 Yelena Bolsun (born 1983), Russian female sprint athlete (sprinter)
 Denis Sokolov (born 1983), Russian rifle shooter
 Irina Tkatchuk (born 1983), Russian figure skater
 Olga Zhitova (born 1983), Russian volleyball player
 Anton Lyuboslavskiy (born 1984), Russian shot putter
 Ilya Rashkovsky (born 1984), Russian pianist
 Andrey Yeshchenko (born 1984), professional Russian football player
 Alexander Mayer (born 1986), professional Russian ice hockey player
 Sergei Ogorodnikov (1986–2018), Russian professional ice hockey center
 Maksim Zyuzin (born 1986), Russian professional football player
 Nina Kraviz (born 1987), Russian DJ, producer, and singer
 Olga Kurban (born 1987), Russian heptathlete
 Arman Pashikian (born 1987), Armenian chess Grandmaster
 Dmitri Pytlev (born 1987), Russian professional football player
 Aleksei Yushchuk (born 1987), Russian professional football player
 Vadim Bogdanov (born 1998), Russian football player
 Alexey Negodaylo (born 1989), Russian bobsledder

1991–2000 
 Denis Koval (born 1991), Russian speed skater
 Rustam Orujov (born 1991), Azerbaijani judoka
 Mariya Ovechkina (born 1991), Russian beauty contest contestant
 Angelina Zhuk-Krasnova (born 1991), Russian athlete specialising in the pole vault
 Darya Dmitriyeva (born 1993), Russian rhythmic gymnast
 Maksim Mashnev (born 1993), Russian football midfielder
 Nazí Paikidze (born 1993), Georgian-American chess player
 Ekaterina Vedeneeva (born 1994), Russian-born Slovenian rhythmic gymnast (born in Irkutsk, Russia and currently based in Ljubljana, Slovenia)
 Eduard Bogdanov (born 1994), Russian football player
 Roman Zobnin (born 1994), Russian football midfielder
 Konstantin Drokov (born 1995), Russian ice hockey defenceman
 Viktor Utyuzhnikov (born 1995), Russian football defender
 Alayna Lutkovskaya (born 1996), Russian pole vaulter
 Maksim Mayrovich (born 1996), Russian football player
 Vladimir Tolmachyov (born 1996), Russian football player
 Grigori Trufanov (born 1997), Russian football player
 Veronika Polyakova (born 1999), Russian rhythmic gymnast

Lived in Irkutsk 

 Mariya Volkonskaya (1805–1863), youngest daughter of the Russian general Nikolay Raevsky and Sophia Konstantinova, granddaughter of Mikhail Lomonosov. Popularly known in Irkutsk as the Princess of Siberia, she founded a local hospital and opened a concert hall, in addition to hosting musical and cultural soirees in her home.
 Rudolf Nureyev (1938–1993), Soviet dancer of ballet and modern dance
 Alitet Nemtushkin (1939–2006), Evenk-Russian poet
 Natalia Lipkovskaya (born 1979), Russian rhythmic gymnast

See also 

 List of Russian people
 List of Russian-language poets

External links 
 Иркутск: Известные люди города 

Irkutsk